Haymarket Books is a left-wing non-profit, independent book publisher based in Chicago.

History
Haymarket Books was founded in 2001 by Anthony Arnove, Ahmed Shawki and Julie Fain, all of whom had previously worked at the International Socialist Review. Its first title was The Struggle for Palestine, a collection of essays by pro-Palestinian activists including Edward Said. Haymarket aims, in Fain's words, "to be a socialist workplace in a capitalist world".

The name of the publishing house refers to the 1886 Haymarket affair, in which an explosion and ensuing gunfire at a labor demonstration in Chicago resulted in the deaths of seven police officers and at least four civilians. Eight anarchists uninvolved in the bombing were subsequently convicted of conspiracy, of whom seven were sentenced to death.

Haymarket was cited by Publishers Weekly on their list of fast-growing independent publishers in 2017 and 2018. As of 2019, Haymarket publishes 40 to 50 books each season.

Publications
Notable Haymarket authors include Michael Bennett, Noam Chomsky, Angela Davis, Eve Ewing, Naomi Klein, Arundhati Roy, Rebecca Solnit, Keeanga-Yamahtta Taylor, Howard Zinn, and Dave Zirin. In 2005 Haymarket published the sportswriter Dave Zirin's What’s My Name, Fool?, a collection of essays on the relationship between sports and politics. In 2018 Haymarket published José Olivarez's poetry collection Citizen Illegal, which won the Chicago Review of Books award for best poetry and was shortlisted for the PEN/Jean Stein Book Award.

Haymarket is known for publishing "provocative books from the left end of the political spectrum."

References

External links

Publishing companies established in 2001
Book publishing companies based in Illinois
Companies based in Chicago
Small press publishing companies
Socialism in the United States
Political book publishing companies